Telephone Building, Old Telephone Building, Telephone Company Building,  or variations with abbreviations or otherwise, may refer to:

 American Telephone & Telegraph Co. Building (Davenport, Iowa)
 American Telephone and Telegraph Company Building (Denmark, South Carolina)
 Old Bell Telephone Building (Osceola, Arkansas)
 Old Telephone Building (Fredericktown, Ohio), listed on the NRHP in Knox County, Ohio
 Telephone Building (Denver, Colorado), NRHP-listed
 Telephone Co. Building (Grand Forks, North Dakota), NRHP-listed
 Telephone Company Bungalow, Paris, Idaho, listed on the NRHP in Bear Lake County, Idaho
 Telephone Exchange Building (Norwich, Connecticut)
 Telephone Exchange Building (Powhatan, Arkansas)

See also
List of telephone company buildings
Bell Telephone Building (disambiguation)
Mountain States Telephone and Telegraph Building (disambiguation)
Telephone Exchange Building (disambiguation)
TCB (disambiguation)